Round Top is an extinct volcano in the Berkeley Hills, just east of Oakland, California.  The peak lies entirely within the bounds of Contra Costa County.  In 1936, the area surrounding the peak was established as Round Top Regional Park, one of the first three parks of the East Bay Regional Parks District.  The park was renamed Sibley Volcanic Regional Preserve for the second president of the park district (1948 to 1958), Robert Sibley, shortly after his death in 1958.

The eruptions that led to Round Top started 10.2 Million years ago and ended more than a million years later. Two main vents of the old volcano are known, one is now under the Lawrence Berkeley National Laboratory, the other is Round Top. The Round Top vent has, over the years, fallen sideways.

See also
 Robert Sibley Volcanic Regional Preserve
 List of summits of the San Francisco Bay Area

References

External links 
 
 

Volcanoes of California
Berkeley Hills
Landforms of Contra Costa County, California
Mountains of the San Francisco Bay Area
Extinct volcanoes
East Bay Regional Park District
Parks in Contra Costa County, California